Chaleh Tarkhan (also Romanized as Chāleh Ţarkhān; also known as Chāl Ţarkhān and Chāh Ţarkhān) is a village in Chaleh Tarkhan Rural District, Qaleh Now District, Ray County, Tehran Province, Iran. According to the 2006 Iranian census, its population was 658, with 172 families. Chaleh Tarkhan Rural District's seat is located in this village.

History 
Stucco wall decorations, dating from the Sassanid Empire, are preserved at Chaleh Tarkhan. In the late 1930s, Erich Schmidt of the University of Pennsylvania's Penn Museum, in collaboration with the Boston Museum of Fine Arts, led an expedition that excavated Chaleh Tarkhan.

References 

Populated places in Ray County, Iran